Belper railway station serves the town of Belper in Derbyshire, England.

History 

The line was surveyed by George Stephenson for the North Midland Railway Company, and opened in 1840.  The Strutt family who had built cotton mills and had become the primary landowner, were great supporters of the line and had invested in it. They feared, however, that it would interfere with the water supply to the mill and affect both theirs and their employees' livelihood, so initially suggested in 1835 that the line should proceed by Holbrook.

This proved unsatisfactory and, in the 1836 Act authorising the line, the proposed route took it to the east of the Derwent through Milford then to the west past Belper. This "Milford Deviation" was still not acceptable, so a revised Act was approved in 1837.

This entailed the building of Milford Tunnel and the excavation of a long cutting, at enormous (and unexpected) expense, with eleven bridges in the space of a mile. The cutting, lined with gritstone, is now a grade 2 listed building.

North of Belper, the engineers paid the penalty of following a river valley, with two long bridges over Belper Pool, plus two more, before reaching Ambergate.

The original station was built on the south side of Belper, just before the cutting, designed by Francis Thompson in an Italianate design.  A coach, or omnibus, ran regularly to it from the Lion Hotel in Bridge Street.  However this proved so unpopular that the Midland Railway built a new station in 1878 within the cutting, at the town centre, next to King Street. This had platforms with access ramps for each of the two lines, both provided with waiting rooms, in the standard Midland Railway design.  The booking office and other facilities were at street level. Since the new station lacked sidings, the old station remained in use for many years for the processing of goods traffic.

Originally the station was a stop on the Midland Railway's main line from London St Pancras to Manchester Central which travelled through the Peak District.

When this line was truncated to its present terminus at Matlock in the late 'sixties and following withdrawal of the Manchester trains, the station became unmanned and in 1973 the station buildings were demolished. The bridge carrying King Street over the line was widened to make room for a number of shops, including a supermarket which was originally Fine Fare and has subsequently had a number of occupiers, currently Poundland.

In 2005 the station was refurbished with new shelters, seats, train indicators and rubbish bins by a consortium of local volunteers, work experience trainees provided by The Groundwork Trust and the local councils, with the active support of Network Rail and Central Trains (who managed the station at that time). In April 2012 a group called Transition Belper adopted the station with the help of the Derwent Valley Line Community Rail Partnership, East Midlands Trains, Network Rail and Belper Town Council. The Community Rail Partnership continues to care for the station.

In 2009 an automatic ticket machine was installed on the Derby-bound platform, followed later by a second machine on the Matlock-bound side. These enable passengers to buy tickets (or collect those purchased in advance) before they board. In December 2009, Belper became a Penalty fare station. The penalty fare applies for any southbound travel and on northbound mainline services. The Ambergate to Matlock branch is not part of the penalty fare scheme. Where the local authority provides a discount, and if the vending machine is unable to issue discounted tickets, they can then be bought on the train.

Stationmasters

Mr. Brandon ca. 1860
Mr. Eden ca. 1861 ca. 1865
John Orton until 1874
Samuel Buxton 1875–1881 (formerly station master at Hassop)
William Henry Buxton 1881–1896 (afterwards station master at Lincoln)
Richard William Mapp ca. 1897–1901 (afterwards station master at Gloucester)
Thomas Pitt 1901–1905 (afterwards station master at St Albans)
Henry Merryweather 1905–1924 
William Washbourne 1924–????
Arthur H. Washbourne ca. 1934
Henry Foster 1938–1947
Edmund T. Jackson 1947–1955  (formerly station master at Spondon)

Services
All services at Belper are operated by East Midlands Railway.

Saturdays also have an hourly service but all the trains originate or end in Derby.

On Sundays, there is a two-hourly service between Matlock and Nottingham in the morning, with services increasing to hourly from mid-afternoon onwards.

References

Further reading 

 Pixton, B., (2000) North Midland: Portrait of a Famous Route, Cheltenham: Runpast Publishing
 The North Midland Railway Guide, (1842) Republished 1973, Leeds: Turntable Enterprises
 Naylor, P. (Ed) (2000) An Illustrated History of Belper and its Environs Belper: M.G.Morris

External links 

 "Picture the Past" Original Station at Belper
   "Picture the Past" Belper Station circa 1910
 "Picture the Past" Station building c.1955

History of Derbyshire
Railway stations in Derbyshire
DfT Category F1 stations
Former Midland Railway stations
Railway stations in Great Britain opened in 1840
Railway stations in Great Britain closed in 1878
Railway stations in Great Britain opened in 1878
Railway stations served by East Midlands Railway
Belper
Francis Thompson railway stations